Joe Zucker (born 1941) is an American artist who was born in Chicago, Illinois, United States.  He received a B.F.A. from the Art Institute of Chicago in 1964 and an M.F.A., from the same institution in 1966.

His art is quirky and idiosyncratic, and most often relates to the materials, such as cotton and plastic.  His Porthole #4 from 1981, in the collection of the Honolulu Museum of Art, demonstrates his innovative use of unusual materials.  The Art Institute of Chicago, the Carnegie Museum of Art (Pittsburgh, Pennsylvania), the Honolulu Museum of Art, the Mary and Leigh Block Museum of Art (Northwestern University, Illinois), the Modern Art Museum of Fort Worth (Fort Worth, Texas), the Museum of Modern Art (New York City), the Parrish Art Museum (Water Mill, New York), the Smithsonian American Art Museum (Washington D.C.), and the Walker Art Center (Minneapolis, Minnesota) are among the public collections holding work by Joe Zucker.

Personal life
Zucker lives in East Hampton, New York, and is a volunteer coach for the Bridgehampton School high school basketball team.  He was featured in the 2017 documentary, Killer Bees, about the school's basketball program, and produced by Shaquille O'Neal.

References
 Hirschl & Adler Galleries, Cy Twombly - Christopher Wilmarth - Joe Zucker, Hirschl & Adler Galleries, New York, 1986
 Kord, Catherine, Richard Artschwager, Chuck Close, Joe Zucker, La Jolla Museum of Contemporary Art, 1976, 
  Yablonsky, Linda,  Joe Zucker: Open Storage, New Paintings / Container Ships, Paul Kasmin, David Nolan Galleries, 2006, 
 Zucker, Joe, Surfacing images: The paintings of Joe Zucker, 1969-1982, Albright-Knox Art Academy, 1982, 
 Zucker, Joe, Joe Zucker. September 28 - October 28, 1989, Hirschl & Adler Modern, 1989, 
 Zucker, Joe, Joe Zucker: Ravenna, GBE (Modern) Gavlak Projects, 2003, 
 Zucker, Joe, Joe Zucker: an Exhibition, Baltimore Museum of Art, 1976. 
 Zucker, Joe, Joe Zucker: a Decade of Paintings (1983-1994), Track 16 Gallery, 1995
 Zucker, Joe and Terry R. Myers Zucker, Joe Zucker: The Grid Paintings'', Corbett vs. Dempsey, Modern Art & Uncommon Objects, Chicago IL, 2011,

Footnotes

American painters